The Australia national rugby union team, known as the Wallabies, has played in all eight Rugby World Cup tournaments. They have won the World Cup on two occasions; only New Zealand and South Africa have won more. Australia has hosted or co-hosted the tournament twice – in 1987 and 2003.

By position

By tournament

1987 New Zealand & Australia
Pool 1

Quarter-final

Semi-final

Third place play-off

1991 UK, Ireland and France
Pool 3

Quarter-final

Semi-final

Final

1995 South Africa
Pool A

Quarter-final

1999 Wales
Pool E

Quarter-final

Semi-final

Final

2003 Australia
Pool A

Quarter-final

Semi-final

Final

2007 France
Pool B

Quarter-final

2011 New Zealand
Pool C

Quarter-final

Semi-final

Third place play-off

2015 England
Pool A

Quarter-final

Semi-final

Final

2019 Japan
Pool D

Quarter-final

Hosting

1987
Australia hosted the first Rugby World Cup in 1987 along with New Zealand. Two stadiums in Australia were used.

Most of the pool games were in New Zealand, but the semi-finals, and one of the quarter-finals, were played in Australia.

2003
Australia won the right to host the World Cup in 2003 without the involvement of New Zealand after a contractual dispute over ground signage rights between the New Zealand Rugby Football Union and Rugby World Cup Limited. The overall stadium capacity was reduced from the 1999 Rugby World Cup in Wales.

The Adelaide Oval underwent a A$20 million redevelopment for the 2003 Rugby World Cup, financed entirely by the South Australian Cricket Association, with two new grandstands built adjacent to the Victor Richardson Gates. Lang Park in Brisbane was a new venue designed specifically for rugby, built at a cost of A$280 million, and was opened just before the start of the 2003 World Cup. The Central Coast Stadium was also a newly built venue, and opened in February 2000 at a cost of A$30 million.

The Sydney Football Stadium was one of two venues in Sydney that were used for football during the 2000 Olympic Games. The other venue in Sydney was the Stadium Australia which was the centrepiece of the 2000 Olympic Games. Also known as Stadium Australia, Telstra Stadium was built at a cost of over A$600 million and was the biggest stadium used in the 2003 World Cup. The only stadium with a retractable roof used was the Docklands Stadium in Melbourne.

Australia intended to bid for the 2015 and 2019 Rugby World Cups, but withdrew from the bidding. The bids were awarded to England and Japan respectively.

Overall record

Team records
Most points in a tournament
345 – 2003
225 – 2007
222 – 2015
221 – 1999
211 – 2011

Most points in a game
 142 – vs , 2003
 91 – vs , 2007
 90 – vs , 2003
 68 – vs , 2011
 67 – vs , 2011
 66 – vs , 2015
 57 – vs , 1999
 55 – vs , 1999
 55 – vs , 2007

Individual records
Most World Cup matches
20 – George Gregan (1995, 1999, 2003, 2007)
19 – Adam Ashley-Cooper (2007, 2011, 2015, 2019)
18 – James Slipper (2011, 2015, 2019)

Most points overall
195 – Michael Lynagh (1987, 1991, 1995)
125 – Matt Burke (1995, 1999)
100 – Elton Flatley (2003)
85 – Bernard Foley (2015, 2019)
70 – Drew Mitchell (2007, 2011, 2015)
65 – Matt Giteau (2003, 2007, 2011, 2015)
60 – Adam Ashley-Cooper (2007, 2011, 2015, 2019)

Most individual points in a game
42 – Mat Rogers vs , 2003
30 – Elton Flatley vs , 2003
28 – Bernard Foley vs , 2015
27 – Matt Giteau vs , 2007
25 – Matt Burke vs , 1999
25 – Chris Latham vs , 2003

Most tries overall
14 – Drew Mitchell (2007, 2011, 2015)
12 – Adam Ashley-Cooper (2007, 2011, 2015, 2019)
11 – Chris Latham (1999, 2003, 2007)
10 – David Campese (1987, 1991, 1995)
8 – Matt Giteau (2003, 2007, 2011, 2015)
7 – Joe Roff (1995, 1999)

Most tries in a game
5 – Chris Latham vs , 2003
3 – Toutai Kefu vs , 1999
3 – Mat Rogers vs , 2003
3 – Lote Tuqiri vs , 2003
3 – Matt Giteau vs , 2003
3 – Rocky Elsom vs , 2003
3 – Drew Mitchell vs , 2007
3 – Adam Ashley-Cooper vs , 2011
3 – Adam Ashley-Cooper vs , 2015

Most penalty goals overall
33 – Michael Lynagh (1987, 1991, 1995)
21 – Elton Flatley (1999, 2003)
19 – Matt Burke (1995, 1999)
17 – Bernard Foley (2015, 2019)
7 – James O'Connor (2011)

Most penalty goals in a game
8 – Matt Burke vs , 1999
7 – Matt Burke vs , 1999
5 – Michael Lynagh vs , 1995
5 – Elton Flatley vs , 2003

Most drop goals
3 – Berrick Barnes (2007, 2011)
2 – Michael Lynagh (1987, 1991, 1995)
1 – George Gregan (1995, 1999, 2003, 2007)
1 – Stephen Larkham (1999, 2003, 2007)
1 – Quade Cooper (2011)

Portrayal on screen
Australia can be seen playing South Africa in the feature film Invictus based on the 1995 Rugby World Cup.

References

 
 

 
World Cup
Australia